Five Gallants may refer to:

Your Five Gallants, a 1607 English comedy play by Thomas Middleton
The Seven Heroes and Five Gallants, a 19th-century Chinese chivalric novel